Elections to High Peak Borough Council in Derbyshire, England were held on 4 May 1995. All of the council was up for election and the Labour Party took control of the council from no overall control.

After the election, the composition of the council was:
Labour 30
Conservative 5
Liberal Democrat 5
Independent 4

Election result

Ward results

References

1995
1995 English local elections
1990s in Derbyshire